Chip Le Grand (born Homer Eugene Le Grand, V) is an Australian journalist who lives in Melbourne. He worked for 25 years for the national newspaper, The Australian, writing about national affairs, sport, politics and crime. In August 2019, he joined The Age newspaper as its chief reporter.

He is the winner of the Walkley Book Award for The Straight Dope, the inside story of the Essendon and Cronulla doping scandals, published in 2015 by Melbourne University Publishing.

His writing was included in an anthology of sports newspaper writing, The Best Australian Sports Writing, 2002.

His 2022 book Lockdown about Australia's response to the COVID-19 pandemic garnered substantial reviews in major Australian publications. He was awarded the June Andrews Award for Arts Journalism in 2022 for his reviews for The Age and The Sydney Morning Herald.

References

Australian journalists
Living people
Year of birth missing (living people)